Poonthenaruvi is a 1974 Indian Malayalam-language film, directed by J. Sasikumar and produced by C. C. Baby and V. M. Chandi. The film stars Prem Nazir, Nanditha Bose, Vincent, Sudheer and Jayan. The music score is by M. K. Arjunan.

Cast

Prem Nazir as Ouseppachan
Nanditha Bose as Valsamma (Dubbing: T. R. Omana)
Jayabharathi as Rosily
Vincent as Sunny
Rani Chandra as Vimala
Sudheer as Shaji
Jayan as Dr. John
Sukumari as Mariamma
K. P. A. C. Lalitha as Kunjamma
Adoor Bhasi as Ummachen
Jose Prakash as Priest
Sankaradi as Isaac
Baby Sumathi as Valsamma's Childhood
Bahadoor as Poovan
Khadeeja as Anna
Meena as Saramma
Philomina as Achamma

Soundtrack
The music was composed by M. K. Arjunan with lyrics by Sreekumaran Thampi.

References

External links
 

1974 films
1970s Malayalam-language films
Films directed by J. Sasikumar